The Alrar gas field is a natural gas field located in the Ouargla Province. It was discovered in 1980 and developed by Sonatrach. It began production in 1980 and produces natural gas and condensates. The total proven reserves of the Alrar gas field are around 4.62 trillion cubic feet (132×109m³), and production is slated to be around 648 million cubic feet/day (18.5×105m³).

References

Natural gas fields in Algeria